Venkatnarayana Road Sri Balaji Temple (Tamil: ஸ்ரீ பாலாஜி) is a Hindu temple located inside the premises of TTD Information Center, Venkatanarayana Road, T.Nagar, Chennai, Tamil Nadu, India. Venkateswara and Alamelu Manga are worshipped in this temple, which also has images of Hayagriva, Varaha, Sri Ramar, Sri Krishna, Andal, Charkratalwar, Ranganatha, Lakshmi, Sridevi and Bhumidevi, Brahma and Ramanujarcharya.

See also
 Religion in Chennai

Vishnu temples
Hindu temples in Chennai